The 2020 AFC Women's Olympic Qualifying Tournament was the 5th edition of the AFC Women's Olympic Qualifying Tournament, the quadrennial international football competition organised by the Asian Football Confederation (AFC) to determine which women's national teams from Asia qualify for the Olympic football tournament.

The top two teams of the tournament qualified for the 2020 Summer Olympics women's football tournament in Japan as the AFC representatives, together with Japan (which already qualified for the 2020 Summer Olympics as the host nation, and did not participate in the qualifying stage).

Format
Of the 47 AFC member associations, a total of 25 AFC member national teams entered the qualifying stage. The format is as follows:
First round: Excluding Japan, the five highest-ranked teams  – which were Australia, North Korea, China PR, South Korea and Thailand – received byes to the third round. The next two highest-ranked teams – Vietnam and Uzbekistan – received byes to the second round. The remaining 18 teams were drawn into two groups of five teams and two groups of four teams, . In each group, teams play each other once at a centralised venue. The group winners, runners-up and two best third placed advance to the second round.
Second round: The twelve teams (two teams who entered this round and ten teams from the first round) are drawn into three groups of four teams. In each group, teams play each other once at a centralised venue. The group winners advanced to the third round.
Third round: The eight teams (five teams who entered this round and the group winners from the second round) are drawn into two groups of four teams. In each group, teams play each other once at a centralised venue. The top two teams of each group advance to the play-off round. 
Play-off round: The group winners play against the runner-ups of the other third round group on a home-and-away basis. The two winners qualify for the Olympic Football Tournament.

Tiebreakers
Teams are ranked according to the following criteria (Regulations for the 2020 Olympic Football Tournaments, Article 19.2 and 19.3):
Points (3 points for a win, 1 point for a draw, 0 points for a loss)
Overall goal difference
Overall goals scored
Drawing of lots by the FIFA Organising Committee

Play-off ties are played on a home-and-away two-legged basis. If the aggregate score is tied after the second leg, the away goals rule is applied, and if still level, extra time is played. The away goals rule is again applied after extra time, and if still level, the penalty shoot-out is used to determine the winner (Regulations for the 2020 Olympic Football Tournaments, Article 19.6).

Teams
The draw for the first round of the qualifiers was held on 2 August 2018 at the AFC House in Kuala Lumpur, Malaysia. All first round hosts were appointed after the draw.

Notes
Teams in bold qualified for the Olympics.
Numbers in parentheses indicate the June 2018 FIFA Women's World Rankings (otherwise unranked).
(H): Qualification first round group hosts (* all chosen as group hosts after the draw, remaining group hosted at neutral venue)
(N): Not a member of the International Olympic Committee, ineligible for Olympics
(W): Withdrew after draw

Did not enter

 (N)

First round
The first round was played between 4–13 November 2018.

Group A
All matches were held in Tajikistan.
Times listed are UTC+5.

Group B
All matches were held in Thailand (neutral venue host).
Times listed are UTC+7.

Group C
All matches were held in Myanmar.
Times listed are UTC+6:30.

Group D
All matches were held in Palestine.
Times listed are UTC+2.

Ranking of third-placed teams
Due to groups having different number of teams after withdrawals, the results against the fourth-placed and fifth-placed teams in four-team and five-team groups were not considered for this ranking.

Second round
The draw for the second round of the qualifiers was held on 13 February 2019, 16:00 MYT (UTC+8), at the AFC House in Kuala Lumpur, Malaysia. For the second round, the twelve teams were drawn into three groups of four teams. The teams were seeded according to their latest FIFA Rankings. The three teams which originally indicated their intention to serve as qualification group hosts (Myanmar, Palestine and Uzbekistan) prior to the draw were drawn into separate groups.

Notes
Numbers in parentheses indicate the December 2018 FIFA Women's World Rankings (NR: unranked).
(H): Qualification second round group hosts (Palestine were chosen to serve as hosts prior to the draw, but were replaced after the draw, and group hosted at neutral venue)

The second round was played between 3–9 April 2019.

Group A
All matches were held in Myanmar.
Times listed are UTC+6:30.

Group B
All matches were held in Uzbekistan.
Times listed are UTC+5.

Group C
All matches were held in Qatar (neutral venue host); matches were originally to be held in Palestine, but were moved as Iranian citizens were banned from entering Palestine territories by Iranian law.
Times listed are UTC+3.

Third round
The draw for the third round of the qualifiers was held on 18 October 2019, 16:00 MYT (UTC+8), at the AFC House in Kuala Lumpur, Malaysia. For the third round, the eight teams were drawn into two groups of four teams. The teams were seeded according to their latest FIFA Rankings. The two teams which originally indicated their intention to serve as qualification group hosts prior to the draw (China and South Korea) were drawn into separate groups (this was already ensured due to them being in the same pot).

Notes
Numbers in parentheses indicate the September 2019 FIFA Women's World Rankings.
(H): Qualification third round group hosts (* Australia replaced China as group hosts after the draw)
(W): Withdrew after draw

The third round was scheduled to be played between 3–9 February 2020. However, the schedule of Group B was extended to 3–13 February 2020 due to a shift for the Group B hosts to Australia and the quarantine requirements of members of the China national team as a result of the COVID-19 pandemic.

Group A
All matches were held in South Korea.
Times listed are UTC+9.
North Korea were reported to have withdrawn from the competition for unknown reasons.

Group B
All matches were originally scheduled to be held in China, but were moved to Australia.
On 22 January 2020, the AFC moved the third round qualifiers Group B from Wuhan to Nanjing, due to the COVID-19 pandemic in China which originated from Wuhan.
On 26 January 2020, as the pandemic worsened in China, the Chinese Football Association withdrew their hosting rights, and all group matches were moved to Sydney in Australia.
On 29 January 2020, after the announcement of the venues and kick-off times, and upon their arrival in Australia, the Chinese team and staff were subject to quarantine at a hotel in Brisbane for a term set to end on 5 February, after the first games were scheduled to be played on 3 February, as a result of the requirements of the Australian government in response to the COVID-19 pandemic in Australia. On 31 January 2020, Football Federation Australia published the amended match schedule which allowed China to play their first match after the quarantine had ended. Further changes to the schedule were announced on 2 and 5 February 2020.
Times listed are UTC+11.

Play-off round
The play-off round was scheduled for 6 March 2020 (first legs hosted by third round group winners) and 11 March 2020 (second legs hosted by third round group runners-up). However, only one of the two ties was played as scheduled.

Due to the COVID-19 pandemic in China, the home leg of China was moved to Campbelltown Stadium in Sydney, Australia instead of in China. The home leg of South Korea was originally scheduled to be played at Yongin Citizen Sports Park in Yongin, but had been cancelled due to the COVID-19 pandemic in South Korea. The Korea Football Association had urged that it must be played in South Korean territory even if the match is played behind closed doors, while the Chinese Football Association had urged that it must be switched to a neutral venue such as Australia due to the re-entry ban to Chinese nationals by the Australian Federal government. On 28 February 2020, the AFC announced both legs were rescheduled to 9 and 14 April 2020. On 9 March 2020, FIFA and AFC announced that play-off matches between South Korea and China were further postponed to 4 and 9 June 2020. On 27 May 2020, FIFA and AFC confirmed that play-off matches between South Korea and China would be postponed to 19 and 24 February 2021, as the Olympics had been postponed to July 2021. On 2 February 2021, FIFA and AFC announced that play-off matches between South Korea and China were further postponed to 8 and 13 April 2021. On 3 March 2021, FIFA and AFC confirmed the venues and time for the play-off matches between South Korea and China.

The two play-off round winners qualified for the 2020 Summer Olympics.

|}

Australia won 7–1 on aggregate.

China won 4–3 on aggregate.

Qualified teams
The following three teams from the AFC qualified for the 2020 Summer Olympic women's football tournament, including Japan which qualified as the hosts.

1 Bold indicates champions for that year. Italic indicates hosts for that year.
2 Australia qualified as a member of the OFC in 2000 and 2004.

Goalscorers
First round: 
Second round: 
Third round: 
Play-off round: 
In total,

References

External links
, the-AFC.com
Women's Olympic Football Tournament 2020, stats.the-AFC.com

2020
Football at the 2020 Summer Olympics – Women's qualification
Women's Olympic Qualifying Tournament
2018 in women's association football
Women's Olympic Qualifying Tournament
2019 in women's association football
Women's Olympic Qualifying Tournament
2020 in women's association football
Women's Olympic Qualifying Tournament
2021 in women's association football
November 2018 sports events in Asia
April 2019 sports events in Asia
February 2020 sports events in Asia
March 2020 sports events in Asia
April 2021 sports events in Asia
Association football events postponed due to the COVID-19 pandemic
Impact of the COVID-19 pandemic on the 2020 Summer Olympics